Thomas Jefferson High School is a public high school in Cedar Rapids, Iowa. It is the eighth largest high school in Iowa. The school's mascot is Jeffy the J-Hawk and the official school colors are Columbia Blue and white.

History
Thomas Jefferson's first class graduated in 1958, but first competed in athletic events starting in the fall of 1957. The school's original population was made up of two formerly separate high schools, Theodore Roosevelt High School, and Woodrow Wilson High School. They merged into one school in April 1958, upon the completion of the construction of the school. Since then, Jefferson has been housed at its current location. The school added a new gymnasium addition to the school in 1990. In addition, a new science wing and music wing were built in 2003. The school has been named a "Blue Ribbon National School of Excellence" two times, one of the few traditional schools to earn this honor twice. In 2012, Jefferson received new geothermal heating.

Statistics
Jefferson has 170 staff members, and 1,516 students. The student to teacher ratio is 17:1.

Academics
Jefferson offers four years of French, German, Japanese, and Spanish. All four languages also offer an AP replacement for 4th year.

Extracurricular activities

Fine arts
Jefferson offers multiple instrumental programs, including marching band "The Band of Blue" under Thad Kelly Driskell Directors of Band, three concert bands, one jazz band, and two pep bands. They also offer six choirs, and three show choirs.  In addition, Jefferson has one orchestra ensemble.

Athletics 
The J-Hawks compete in the Mississippi Valley Conference in the following sports:

Cross Country
 Girls' 1980 Class 3A State Champions
Volleyball
Football
 3-time State Champions (1964, 1965, 1972)
Basketball
 Boys' 1967 Class 2A State Champions
 Girls' 1993 State Champions
Wrestling
 3-time State Champions (1962, 1973, 1974) 
Swimming
Track and Field
 Boys' 1962 Class AA State Champions
Golf
 Boys' 1965 Class AA State Champions
Soccer
Softball
 3-time State Champions (1983, 1997, 1998)
Baseball
 1961 State Champions 
Tennis
 Girls' 1990 Class 2A State Champions
Bowling

Notable people

Alumni
 Landon Cassill, NASCAR driver
 Jacob Jaacks, professional basketball player 
 Larry Lawrence, former Oakland Raider, played in the Super Bowl 
 Todd Taylor, Iowa State Senator, District 35
Jarrod Uthoff, basketball player for the Iowa Hawkeyes, former Mr. Basketball in Iowa, forward for the Dallas Mavericks 
 Mark Walter, founder and the chief executive officer of Guggenheim Partners and Chairman of the Los Angeles Dodgers

Tom Hankins World Famous professional wrestler from 1973 through 1986

Faculty
 Wally Horn, former teacher, former Iowa State Senator
Bob Vander Plaats, former teacher and coach

See also
List of high schools in Iowa

References

External links
 

Public high schools in Iowa
Schools in Cedar Rapids, Iowa
Educational institutions established in 1958
1958 establishments in Iowa
Schools in Linn County, Iowa